The Lockheed Martin Sniper is a targeting pod for military aircraft that provides positive target identification, autonomous tracking, GPS coordinate generation, and precise weapons guidance from extended standoff ranges.

The system has been designated AN/AAQ-33 in U.S. military service as the Sniper Advanced Targeting Pod (ATP). Further variants are the Sniper Extended Range (XR), as well as the PANTERA export derivative of the Sniper XR. The Lockheed Martin F-35 Lightning II is built with the equivalent of the Sniper XR in its onboard sensors. The most modern version is the Sniper Advanced Targeting Pod - Sensor Enhancement (ATP-SE).

Design

The Sniper is a single, lightweight targeting pod with much lower aerodynamic drag than the systems it replaces . Its image processing allows aircrews to detect, identify and engage tactical-size targets outside the range of most enemy air defenses, giving it a crucial role in the destruction of enemy air defense missions. It also supports urban engagements beyond jet noise range for counter-insurgency operations. It offers  a 3-5X increase in detection range over the older LANTIRN system , and is currently flying on U.S. Air Force and multinational F-16, F-15, B-1B, CF-18, Harrier, A-10, B-52 and Tornado aircraft.

The pod incorporates a high definition mid-wave FLIR, dual-mode laser, visible-light HDTV, laser spot tracker, laser marker, video data link, and a digital data recorder. Advanced sensors and image processing incorporating image stabilization enable targets to be identified at ranges which minimize exposure to defensive enemy systems. The dual-mode laser offers an eye-safe mode for urban combat and training operations along with a laser-guided bomb designation laser.

The pod's FLIR allows observation and tracking through smoke and clouds, and in low light / no light conditions. The CCD camera supports the same operations in visible light for most daylight conditions. 

For target coordination with ground and air forces, a laser spot tracker, a laser marker, and an HDTV quality video down-link to ground-based controllers supports rapid target detection and identification. The Sniper can also provide high-resolution imagery for non-traditional Intelligence, surveillance and reconnaissance (NTISR) missions without occupying the centerline station on small fighter aircraft, and can maintain surveillance even when the aircraft maneuvers. As a result, a second, dedicated fighter aircraft isn't needed to provide protection to a dedicated ISR aircraft, which many small nations cannot afford.

For ease of maintenance, Sniper's optical bed design, partitioning, and diagnostic capabilities permit two-level maintenance, eliminating costly intermediate-level support. Automated built-in testing allows maintenance personnel to isolate and replace a line replaceable unit in under 20 minutes to restore full mission-capable status.

In use

In August 2001, the U.S. Air Force announced Lockheed Martin's Sniper as the winner of the Advanced Targeting Pod (ATP) competition. The contract provides for pods and associated equipment, spares and support of the F-16 and F-15E aircraft for the entire force, active-duty Air Force and Air National Guard. The U.S. Air Force initial seven-year contract for Sniper ATP has potential value in excess of $843 million. The Sniper ATP has delivered over 125 pods and the U.S. Air Force plans to procure at least 522 Sniper ATPs. The follow-on Advanced Targeting Pod - Sensor Enhancement (ATP-SE) contract was split between the Lockheed Martin Sniper and the LITENING.

In 2014, the USAF declared initial operational capability for the Sniper ATP-SE which included sensor and networking improvements.

The Sniper is used on the U.S. Air Force B-52H Stratofortress, B-1B Lancer, F-15E Strike Eagle, F-16 Fighting Falcon, and A-10 Thunderbolt II. It was also used on the British Harrier GR9 and the Canadian CF-18 Hornet. In 2016 Lockheed Martin announced that Kuwait would be the first country to use Sniper on the Eurofighter Typhoon. A team of Lockheed Martin UK, BAE Systems and Leonardo S.p.A. (Selex S&AS at the time) has successfully demonstrated and flown a Sniper ATP on board a Tornado GR4 combat aircraft.

The Sniper came under fire in 2014 in the aftermath of a deadly airstrike in Afghanistan that saw five American and one Afghan soldier killed when a B-1B bomber equipped with the pod could not detect the infrared strobe lights on the helmets of U.S. troops in a firefight, resulting in the deadliest case of friendly fire between American forces in the course of the Afghanistan War. On 27 March 2015, Lockheed Martin was awarded a sole-source contract by the US DOD worth $485 million firm fixed price with minimal cost-plus-fixed-fee, indefinite-delivery/indefinite-quantity to provide multiple Sniper advanced targeting pods to the USAF.

Operators

Belgian Air Force

Royal Canadian Air Force

Egyptian Air Force

Indonesian Air Force

Iraqi Air Force

Japan Air Self Defence Force

Royal Jordanian Air Force

Republic of Korea Air Force

Royal Moroccan Air Force

Royal Netherlands Air Force

Royal Norwegian Air Force

Royal Air Force of Oman

Pakistan Air Force

Polish Air Force

Romanian Air Force

Royal Saudi Air Force

Republic of Singapore Air Force

Republic of China Air Force

Royal Thai Air Force

Hellenic Air Force

Turkish Air Force

United Arab Emirates Air Force

Royal Air Force

United States Air Force

Specifications
Primary function: Positive identification, automatic tracking and laser designation
Prime contractor: Lockheed Martin
Length: 98.2 inches (252 centimeters)
Diameter: 11.9 inches (30.5 centimeters)
Weight: 446 pounds (202 kilograms)
Aircraft: F-15E, F-16, A-10, B-1, B-52, CF-18, Harrier, Tornado GR4, KAI T-50 Golden Eagle, F-2
Sensors: Mid-wave third generation Forward looking infrared, dual mode eye-safe, laser designator, Charge-coupled device-TV, laser spot tracker and laser designator
Date deployed: January 2005

See also
 AN/ASQ-228 ATFLIR
 LANTIRN AN/AAQ-13 & AN/AAQ-14
 Litening AN/AAQ-28(V)

References

Notes

Bibliography

External links
 
 Lockheed Martin's Sniper ATP page
  "Sniper Targeting Pod Attacks From Long Standoff Ranges", Aviation Week & Space Technology, October 3, 2004.
 https://web.archive.org/web/20151115035632/http://materion.com/Markets/DefenseandScience/OpticsandOpticalSystems/OpticalSystems.aspx
 http://www.lockheedmartin.com/us/news/press-releases/2015/april/mfc-lm-delivers-1000-sniper-atp.html
 http://www.strategicmaterials.dla.mil/iamthekey/Documents/Strategic%20Materials%20-%20One-Pagers%20Document.pdf "Lightweight Strategic Materials"
 https://web.archive.org/web/20150910111226/http://www.ibcadvancedalloys.com/news/2015/09/09/2015/ibc-engineered-materials-awarded-hard-tooling-contract-for-lockheed-martin-s-sniper-advanced-targeting-pod-components/

Targeting pods
Military electronics of the United States
Military equipment introduced in the 2000s